Bonorva is a comune (municipality) in the Province of Sassari in the Italian region Sardinia, located about  north of Cagliari and about  southeast of Sassari.

References

Cities and towns in Sardinia